Senator Woodruff may refer to:

Christian B. Woodruff (1828–1871), New York State Senate
Rollin S. Woodruff (1854–1925), Connecticut State Senate